Kristian Tonning Riise  (born 27 October 1988) is a Norwegian politician. 
He was elected representative to the Storting for the period 2017–2021 for the Conservative Party.

He was elected leader of the Norwegian Young Conservatives in June 2014. He resigned in January 2018 after it was revealed that he had sexually assaulted a 16-year old girl.

In 2013, Riise published a book about Hugo Chávez.

References

1988 births
Living people
Conservative Party (Norway) politicians
Members of the Storting
Hedmark politicians
21st-century Norwegian politicians